Sugar Loaf, sometimes called The Sugar Loaf ( or ), is a hill situated  north-west of Abergavenny in Monmouthshire, Wales and sits within the Brecon Beacons National Park.  It is the southernmost of the summit peaks of the Black Mountains, with a height of 1,955 feet (596 metres). Sugar Loaf was gifted to the National Trust by suffragette Lady Rhondda.

Name 
The original Welsh name of the hill appears to have been Mynydd Pen-y-fâl. Translated into English, this name means 'mountain of the head/top of the peak/summit' from mynydd, pen and bâl. The name Sugar Loaf has been popularly applied to numerous hills which have a perceived resemblance to a sugarloaf; the nearest other such hill is the Sugar Loaf, Carmarthenshire.

Prehistory 
A southern foothill of Sugar Loaf, Y Graig, was discovered in the 1990s to be the site of prehistoric flint tools dating from the Mesolithic, Neolithic and Bronze Ages.

Geology 
It is a popular misconception that Sugar Loaf is an 'extinct volcano'; an idea born perhaps from the striking resemblance of its conical outline, particularly when seen from the east, to that of a classic volcano. It is however composed entirely of sedimentary rocks. In common with the rest of the Black Mountains, the hill is formed from Old Red Sandstone which was laid down largely during the early part of the Devonian Period. The very summit of Sugar Loaf is formed from sandstones of the Quartz Conglomerate Group which are of late Devonian age. There are a number of landslips on its flanks which are believed to date from early post-glacial times. The former Usk Valley glacier divided to north and south of it as it travelled eastwards, though the mountain itself is largely free from glacial till.

Land use 
The mountain is in the ownership of the National Trust who manage its grazing by Welsh mountain sheep. The lower slopes are deciduous mixed woodland with fern, heather and bilberry, known locally as whinberry, on the upland slopes. The wooded slopes have been designated a Site of Special Scientific Interest.

A vineyard, producing Sugar Loaf wines, is situated at Dummar Farm at the foot of the mountain on south facing slopes near Abergavenny.

Walking and view from the summit
The view from the summit covers the Black Mountains to the north, the Cotswolds to the east, as far as the Brecon Beacons including Pen y Fan and Corn Du to the west and the Bristol Channel to the south. The Skirrid is easily visible to the immediate east, including its spectacular landslip at its northern end.
On a clear day it is possible to see hills as far north as Shropshire and as far south as Somerset.

References

External links

 The History of the Sugar Loaf
 Photo showing how it gets its name
 Photo from the Skirrid

Black Mountains, Wales
Mountains and hills of Monmouthshire
Sites of Special Scientific Interest in Monmouthshire
Landmarks in Wales
Marilyns of Wales